Balmoral is a cruise ship owned and operated by Fred. Olsen Cruise Lines. She was built in 1988 by the Meyer Werft shipyard in Papenburg, West Germany, as Crown Odyssey for Royal Cruise Line. She has also sailed for the Norwegian Cruise Line as Norwegian Crown and Orient Lines as Crown Odyssey.

History

The vessel was built by Meyer Werft of Papenburg, Germany, in 1988, for service with Royal Cruise Line as the Crown Odyssey.  In 1989, Royal Cruise Line was sold to Norwegian Cruise Line, which continued operation of the company, along with the Crown Odyssey, until 1996. A reorganization of all the fleets owned by Norwegian Cruise Line saw Crown Odyssey enter service with NCL's main fleet, where it was renamed Norwegian Crown.

Following the purchase of Orient Lines by NCL in April 2000, Norwegian Crown was transferred, regaining her original name, Crown Odyssey, in the process.

In September 2003, Crown Odyssey was refurbished and returned to the NCL fleet, again with the name Norwegian Crown.

On 25 May 2006, NCL Corporation announced that its parent company, Star Cruises, had agreed to sell Norwegian Crown to Fred. Olsen Cruise Lines effective August 2006. Star Cruises concurrently chartered the vessel back from Fred. Olsen and NCL continued her deployment through to November 2007. "Although a beautiful and well-maintained vessel, Norwegian Crown's smaller size is less suitable for Star Cruises' ambitions in Asia," said Colin Veitch, president and CEO of NCL Corporation. "Fred. Olsen Cruise Lines specializes in operating smaller and mid-sized upscale vessels and this ship should fit perfectly in their fleet." Her last NCL cruise was on 28 October 2007.

On 21 January 2009, during a cruise, the ship sailed into rough weather in the Bay of Biscay, smashing through  waves and  winds. Two passengers were sent to a hospital in A Coruña, Spain, with serious injuries.

Reconstruction

Fred. Olsen took delivery of the ship on 7 November 2007, renaming her after the Balmoral estate in 2008. The company initiated a major refit at the Blohm + Voss repair shipyard in Hamburg, Germany, before her inaugural cruise on 13 February 2008, to Florida—her base for Caribbean cruising. The work lengthening the ship with an insertion of a  midsection, built in conjunction with Schichau Seebeckwerft in Bremerhaven, and floated into Hamburg at the end of October 2007.

The reconstruction added a further 186 passenger and 53 crew cabins as well as creating new and modified public areas.

Titanic commemoration

She set sail from Southampton on 8 April 2012, passing Cherbourg and then on to Cobh, formerly Queenstown, in the Republic of Ireland, arriving on 9 April 2012. Cobh was the last port of call for RMS Titanic before she set off across the Atlantic.

Balmoral reached the site of the wreck of Titanic in time for the 100th anniversary of the sinking at 11pm on 14 April 2012. A memorial service was held onboard which culminated in three floral wreaths being cast overboard. Balmoral remained at the location overnight and then departed early the following morning, with the intention of reaching Titanics intended destination of New York City.

Public spaces
Balmoral has eleven decks, nine of which are designated passenger decks, numbered 3 to 11.

References

External links

 Official Balmoral page at Fred. Olsen Cruise Lines site
 Photos, Video Clips & Review of Balmoral from February 2008 at magwa.co.uk
 Video of Balmoral in the Vineyard Sound
 
 Balmoral International Group Balmoral International Group Luxembourg

Cruise ships
Cruise ships of Norway
Passenger ships of Norway
Fred. Olsen & Co.
1987 ships
Ships built in Papenburg